Vadnagar is a town and municipality in the Mehsana district of the state of Gujarat in India. It just about 35 km from Mehsana city. Its ancient names include Anartapura (the town of Anarta) and Anandapura. It was a Buddhist location visited by Xuanzang in 640 C.E. Historian and archaeologist Alexander Cunningham has identified Anandapura with the town of Vadnagar.

Vadnagar is also the birthplace of Narendra Modi, the current Prime Minister of India.

History

Several ancient inscriptions and literary sources mention a town called Anartapura or Anandapura, identified as the area in and around the present-day Vadnagar. The epic tale Mahabharata mentions the Anarta Kingdom in the northern part of present-day Gujarat. The oldest Puranic legend about Gujarat is about a king named Anartha. The town is mentioned in the Tirtha Mahatmya section of Nagara Khanda of Skanda Purana by the name of Chamatkarapura. The Junagadh rock inscription (dating from 150 C.E.) of Western Kshatrapa King Rudradaman I mentions a region called "Anartha" (meaningless) in northern present-day Gujarat.

The Maitraka rulers of Vallabhi (505-648 C.E.) issued land grants to the Brahmins of Anarthapura or Anandapura. The Harsola copper plates (949 C.E.) of the Paramara king record the granting of two villages in Gujarat area to the Nagar Brahmins who originated from Anandapura. This Anandapura is also identified with Vadnagar, which is associated with the Nagar Brahmins. In 2009, archaeologists discovered a 4 km long fortification near Vadnagar which they believe could be the historical Anartapura.

Vadnagar has also yielded an image of Bodhisattva dated back to the 3rd or 4th century C.E. This image may have been brought from Mathura to install in one of the town's Buddhist monasteries.

Vadnagar's old town is found inside the walls of a fort with six gates: Arjun, Nadiol, Amarthol, Ghaskol and Pithori.

The town was added to the tentative list of the UNESCO World Heritage Site in December 2022.

Geography 
It has an average elevation of 143 metres (469 feet) above sea level.

Demographics
 India census, Vadnagar's population was 27,790, including 14,097 males and 13,693 females. Its female sex ratio is 971 compared to the state average of 919. Moreover, Vadnagar's child sex ratio is around 937 compared to the 890 Gujarat state average. Vadnagar's average literacy rate is 80.53%, higher than the 78.03% national average: male literacy is 90.41%, and female literacy is 70.42%. In Vadnagar, 12.26% of the population is under 6 years of age.

Languages
Gujarati is spoken by most of the people in Vadnagar. Hindi and English are also spoken.

Transport

Vadnagar is served by a bus stand and a railway station. Buses are available from here to all major towns in Gujarat. Vadnagar railway station is on the Mahesana–Taranga Hill line, a branch railway line within the Ahmedabad railway division of the Western Railway zone.

Places of interest

Sharmistha Lake is a lake in Vadnagar with a small island amidst it connected by a 7 km long inlet canal. The island has been developed into an urban park. As of 2009, the island includes a stadium. 

There are scores of temples dedicated to almost every god: Shiva (Daaneshwar Mahadev Temple, Somnath Mahadev Temple and Kashi Vishveshvara temple), Vishnupuri, Chhabila, Hanuman, Ashapuri Mata, Ambaji Mata, Sitla mata, Bhuvaneshpuri Temple, Amther Mata, Gauri kund, Swaminarayan Temple. There are remains of a Buddhist monastery dating from the 7th century C.E. as well as two Jain derasars.

Hatkeshver Mahadev temple, a 15th-century temple, is the most significant of the numerous Shiva shrines. He is the family deity of the Nagar Brahmins. Facing east, the temple is enclosed by a high wall surmounted by three circular domes. From the roof of the sanctum a massive pinnacle rises high above into the sky. A massive congregation hall leads to the sanctum which houses a shivling said to have self-emerged, or as it is said, Swayambhu (self-emerged). The temple's exterior is exquisitely and profusely ornamented with figures of the nine planets, regent deities, the chief gods of the Hindu pantheon, scenes from the life of Krishna and Pandava princes, as well as varied animal and floral motifs.

Sitala Mata temple, is ornately carved with figures of celestial beings. Its door frames and ceilings depict the Rasmandala (Krishna dancing with milkmaids).

Two Kirtistambhas, or triumphal arches, are built of red sandstone and are both identical in size and style. Its pillars and arches are decorated with lozenges at the base and geometric and floral designs (i.e., leaves, creepers and lotus), animal motifs, human figures engaged in various activities, and divine figures in different poses. The top bears an image of a seated god Kartikeya flanked by Ganesh and Makara (a griffin) from which spring arches. A number of standing female figures also ornament the top.

Other places of interest are Kirti Toran or Narsinh Mehta’s Chori, a toran built in 12th century and in Solanki style although Narsinh Mehta was born in 15th century, Tana Riri garden and shrine, Gauri Kund, Pancham Mehta's well, Janjanio well, Baithakji of Gusaiji, an ancient library and a directional stone from the Solanki era.

Education

Schools
 Anart Shikshan Kendra
 Shri B. N. High School
 Jawahar Navodaya Vidyalaya
 Navin Sarva Vidyalaya
 Pattharwali School
 Royal English Medium School
 Saraswati Vidya Mandir
 Sarvajanik Vidyayalay, Vaghasi
 Vadnagar Girls High School

Colleges
 Arts and Commerce College, Vadnagar
 GMERS Medical College, Vadnagar 
 Government ITI, Vadnagar
 Government Polytechnic, Vadnagar
 Government Science College, Vadnagar

Healthcare
Hospitals
 Bhavna Hospital
 Drishti Hospital
 GMERS Medical College & Civil Hospital
 Sadbhavna Hospital
 Sardar Patel General Hospital
 Vadnagar Nagrik Mandal Hospital
 Vasant Prabha Hospital

Notable people
 Narendra Modi, 14th and current Prime Minister of India
 Shankar Chaudhary, politician, current speaker of Gujarat Legislative Assembly, former Minister of State for Health and Family Welfare, Medical Education, Environment (All Independent charges) and Urban Development, Government of Gujarat
 Asit Kumarr Modi, Indian TV producer and actor, known for Taarak Mehta Ka Ooltah Chashmah
 Vasant Parikh, Indian politician

See also 
 Koli rebellions

References

Cities and towns in Mehsana district
World Heritage Tentative List for India